Akarca may refer to several places:

Akarca, Dazkırı, a village in Dazkırı district of Afyonkarahisar Province, Turkey
Akarca, Kozan, a village in Kozan district of Adana Province, Turkey
Akarca, Mersin, a village in Mezitli district of Mersin Province, Turkey
Akarca, Mustafakemalpaşa
Akarca, Şereflikoçhisar, a village in the Şereflikoçhisar district of Ankara Province, Turkey